Erling Larsson (1 April 1905 – 17 December 1976) was a Norwegian politician for the Liberal Party.

He was born in Hjelmeland and attended Stord Teachers' College. After working as a teacher in Hjelmeland, he moved to Sauda in 1928. From 1949 to 1972 he was the director of education in Sauda municipality. He was also elected to Sauda municipal council from 1946 to 1967, serving three non-consecutive terms as mayor. He chaired Rogaland municipal council from 1963 to 1967.

He served as a deputy representative to the Parliament of Norway from Rogaland during the terms 1958–1961, 1961–1965 and 1965–1969. In total he met during 9 days of parliamentary session. His political issues included supporting Nynorsk and the temperance movement. When the Liberal Party split in 1972, Larsson aligned with the Liberal People's Party.

He was awarded the King's Medal of Merit in gold in 1976, but died in the same year.

References

1905 births
1976 deaths
People from Hjelmeland
People from Sauda
Stord/Haugesund University College alumni
Norwegian schoolteachers
Deputy members of the Storting
Liberal Party (Norway) politicians
Mayors of places in Rogaland